Bodianus macrognathos, the giant hogfish, is a species of wrasse. 
It is found in the Western Indian Ocean.

Size

References

Morris, R.E. (1974): A new labrid fish from the North Kenya Banks. Copeia 1974: 632–634. 

macrognathos
Fish of the Indian Ocean

Taxa named by R. E. Morris
Fish described in 2006